The Birth of a Nation is a 2016 American period drama film written and directed by Nate Parker in his directorial debut. It is based on the story of Nat Turner, the enslaved man who led a slave rebellion in Southampton County, Virginia, in 1831. The film stars Parker as Turner, with Armie Hammer, Mark Boone Jr., Colman Domingo, Aunjanue Ellis, Dwight Henry, Aja Naomi King, Esther Scott, Roger Guenveur Smith, Gabrielle Union, Penelope Ann Miller, and Jackie Earle Haley in supporting roles. Parker also petitioned financiers to invest in the film, ultimately getting an $8.5 million production budget, and started filming in May 2015 in Georgia. The film's title is an ironic callback to the 1915 KKK-focused silent film.

The Birth of a Nation premiered in competition at the 2016 Sundance Film Festival, where Fox Searchlight Pictures bought worldwide rights to the film in a $17.5 million deal (at the time the largest deal at the festival), and won the Audience Award and Grand Jury Prize in the U.S. Dramatic Competition. The film was theatrically released in the United States on October 7, 2016, and grossed $16 million, receiving positive reviews from critics, with praise for its directing, acting, soundtrack, and cinematography.

Because The Birth of a Nation attracted increased attention during its festival run, there was significant press coverage of a 1999 alleged rape that Parker and co-story writer Jean McGianni Celestin were accused of having committed, and the fact that the accuser committed suicide in 2012. While Parker was acquitted and Celestin was not retried after his conviction was overturned on appeal, the controversy surrounding the alleged rape and Parker's initial responses to the controversy cast a shadow over the film.

Plot

In 1809, on a plantation in Southampton County, Virginia, Nat Turner is a pre-teen slave boy. The adult slaves have little food for their children, and Nat's father Isaac slips out one night to steal something for his son to eat. On the road, Isaac is caught by a posse led by slave-catcher Raymond Cobb. When Cobb tries to execute him, Isaac turns the tables, kills one member of the posse, and flees. He then returns home, tells his family what happened and says that he has to leave immediately, but not without speaking to Nat once more, insisting that Nat is "a child of God" and has a purpose. When Cobb arrives and questions Isaac's family about his whereabouts, nobody says anything and Benjamin Turner, the owner of the farm, intervenes and drives Cobb off before he turns violent.

When Elizabeth Turner, Benjamin's wife, notices that Nat has basic reading skills, she starts to teach him reading, hoping that he can be helpful in the household with his knowledge. Most of her lessons center around the Bible. Elizabeth even goes so far as to have Nat read Scripture during church gatherings. But shortly before Benjamin dies, presumably of tuberculosis, he orders his wife to stop teaching Nat and send him to work as a farmhand.

Now an adult, Nat is still picking cotton, but he also preaches and reads Scripture for his fellow slaves on the plantation. Samuel Turner, Benjamin's son, inherits ownership of the plantation. During a slave auction, Nat is immediately smitten by one of the female slaves for sale, Cherry. He convinces Samuel to buy her as a wedding gift for Catherine Turner, Samuel's sister. Nat and Cherry fall in love, marry, and conceive a daughter.

Since the economic situation in the South has turned and prices for crops are poor, many slave owners have problems feeding their slaves and fear revolts. Reverend Walthall makes Samuel an offer: several plantation owners will pay good money if Samuel will travel to their farms with Nat and have Nat preach to the slaves to pacify them and convince them that the Bible requests them to endure their situations. Samuel, needing the money, reluctantly agrees. During their visits, Nat and Samuel witness emaciated and desperate slaves and, in some locations, horrifying treatment of the slaves by their owners.

When his grandmother dies, Nat decides that he will rise up against the slaveholders. He holds a secret night meeting with some trusted fellow slaves, among them one boy from another plantation, and prepares them for the uprising. He also talks with Cherry, who still has not recovered from the beating, about the uprising and she gives him her blessing.

During the night, Nat and a fellow slave enter the house of their owners and kill Samuel and the manager. They then ask the other slaves of the plantation to follow them, which most of them do. During the night, they take over several other plantations and kill the slave owners. During one of the takeovers, they notice that the boy has disappeared. A short time later, they are attacked by a group of white men who had been alerted by the boy, and they have to retreat.

In the morning, they enter the town of Jerusalem to loot it for weapons. They are confronted by a group of white men, again led by Cobb, but they manage to defeat the group, with Nat personally stabbing Cobb to death. But when they enter the arsenal, they notice that it is empty. They are immediately ambushed by soldiers who kill every slave except for Nat, who flees.

When Nat manages to secretly meet Cherry once more, she tells him that innocent slaves have been murdered in retaliation and more will be as long as Nat is on the run. Nat turns himself in and is condemned to death. During the hanging, Nat notices the slave boy who betrayed the group in the crowd but Nat does not seem to harbor ill will towards him. The film ends with a fade of the boy's crying face into the face of an adult soldier who presumably is the same boy, grown up and fighting for the Union Army in the American Civil War.

Cast

 Nate Parker as Nat Turner
 Armie Hammer as Samuel Turner
 Mark Boone Junior as Rev. Walthall
 Colman Domingo as Hark Turner
 Aunjanue Ellis as Nancy Turner
 Dwight Henry as Isaac Turner
 Aja Naomi King as Cherry Turner
 Esther Scott as Bridget Turner
 Roger Guenveur Smith as Isaiah
 Gabrielle Union as Esther
 Penelope Ann Miller as Elizabeth Turner
 Jackie Earle Haley as Raymond Cobb
 Tony Espinosa as young Nat Turner
 Jayson Warner Smith as Hank Fowler
 Jason Stuart as Joseph Randall
 Steve Coulter as General Childs

Title
The 2016 film uses the same title as "D. W. Griffith's 1915 KKK propaganda film in a very purposeful way", said The Hollywood Reporter. Parker has said his film had the same title "ironically, but very much by design". He told the magazine Filmmaker:

Griffith's film relied heavily on racist propaganda to evoke fear and desperation as a tool to solidify white supremacy as the lifeblood of American sustenance. Not only did this film motivate the massive resurgence of the terror group the Ku Klux Klan and the carnage exacted against people of African descent, it served as the foundation of the film industry we know today. I've reclaimed this title and re-purposed it as a tool to challenge racism and white supremacy in America, to inspire a riotous disposition toward any and all injustice in this country (and abroad) and to promote the kind of honest confrontation that will galvanize our society toward healing and sustained systemic change.

Production

The Birth of a Nation was written, produced, and directed by Nate Parker, who also stars as Nat Turner. Parker wrote the screenplay, which was based on a story he co-wrote with Jean McGianni Celestin. Parker learned about Turner from an African-American studies course at the University of Oklahoma. He began writing the screenplay for a Nat Turner film in 2009 and had a fellowship at a lab under the Sundance Institute. While he got writing feedback from filmmakers like James Mangold, he was told that a Nat Turner film could not be produced. The Hollywood Reporter said:
But what he heard instead were all the reasons a movie about Nat Turner wouldn't work: Movies with black leads don't play internationally; a period film with big fight scenes would be too expensive; it was too violent; it wouldn't work without a big box-office star leading it; Turner was too controversial—after all, he was responsible for the deaths of dozens of well-off white landowners.

After Parker finished his acting role in Beyond the Lights in late 2013, he told his agents he would not continue acting until he had played Nat Turner in a film. He invested $100,000 of his money to hire a production designer and to pay for location scouting in Savannah, Georgia. He met with multiple financiers, and the first to invest in the film were retired basketball player Michael Finley (who had previously invested in the film The Butler) and active basketball player Tony Parker (no relation). Parker eventually brought together eleven groups of investors to finance 60% of the production budget, and producer Aaron L. Gilbert of Bron Studios joined to cover the remaining financing.

In November 2014, development was underway, and Armie Hammer joined the cast. By April 2015, Aja Naomi King and Gabrielle Union joined the cast. In subsequent months, Penelope Ann Miller, Jackie Earle Haley, and Mark Boone Junior also joined. Filming took place in Georgia (including at Myrtle Grove Plantation) in May 2015 and lasted 27 days. Parker used the a cappella choir from Wiley College on the soundtrack. Parker had previously been part of a cast that portrayed historical figures from Wiley, in The Great Debaters.

Music

Release
Before it screened, the audience gave a standing ovation to the introduction of Nate Parker. Afterwards, Variety said it "received the most enthusiastic standing ovation at this year's Sundance Film Festival so far". Following The Birth of a Nations Sundance premiere, Fox Searchlight Pictures bought worldwide rights to the film in a  deal. Competing deals also came from The Weinstein Company, Sony Pictures Entertainment, and Netflix. Variety said Fox Searchlight's deal was "the richest in Sundance history".

A teaser trailer for the film was released in April 2016, followed by an official trailer on June 21, 2016. On July 6, the UK release date of January 20, 2017, was announced. It was actually released in the UK on December 9, 2016. A film poster with Parker in a noose made from an American flag was released on July 15.

20th Century Fox canceled the planned 2017 release of the film in Japan, Switzerland, Norway, Finland, Denmark, Austria, and Latin America following the disappointing results at the U.S. box office, which damaged the overall distribution budget for the film.

Rape allegations against Parker
In August 2016, media attention surrounding the film resurfaced 1999 alleged rape charges against Nate Parker and co-writer Jean McGianni Celestin. While students at Pennsylvania State University, Parker and Celestin were accused of raping a female student. The woman went to a doctor, who concluded that she had been sexually assaulted, and local authorities taped a phone conversation between her and Parker in which Parker confirmed that it was he and Celestin who had sex with her. Parker and Celestin denied the accusations and said that the sexual encounter was consensual. Parker was acquitted of all charges in 2001; Celestin was convicted of sexual assault, but the conviction was overturned on appeal in 2005. A subsequent retrial did not take place.

In a formal complaint filed against Penn State in 2002, the woman also stated that she was harassed by Parker and Celestin following her allegation; the harassment allegedly "included Parker and Celestin hiring a private investigator to publicly expose her as the accuser, and continued bullying by Parker and his friends outside buildings where she had class". The university settled the complaint with the woman for $17,500. The woman committed suicide in 2012, with her death certificate noting that she suffered from "major depressive disorder with psychotic features, PTSD due to physical and sexual abuse, polysubstance abuse".

Because The Birth of a Nation attracted increased scrutiny due to possible Oscar nominations, and the film itself depicts a fictional, brutal rape that does not appear in historical records, there was significant press coverage about damage control by Fox Searchlight Pictures, the studio releasing the film. Interviews in Variety and Deadline were a focus, as was Parker's response to the event in an impassioned Facebook post. The studio reportedly took a wait-and-see approach before marketing to church groups, college campuses, and Hollywood figures.

Writing in Variety, the sister of Parker's alleged victim expressed particular distress at the film's imagined rape scene, saying, "I find it creepy and perverse that Parker and Celestin would put a fictional rape at the center of their film, and that Parker would portray himself as a hero avenging that rape. Given what happened to my sister, and how no one was held accountable for it, I find this invention self-serving and sinister, and I take it as a cruel insult to my sister's memory."

Gabrielle Union, a rape survivor and one of the main stars in The Birth of a Nation, wrote in the Los Angeles Times to express her concern over the allegations, particularly the lack of affirmative consent: "Even if she never said 'no', silence certainly does not equal 'yes'. Although it's often difficult to read and understand body language, the fact that some individuals interpret the absence of a 'no' as a 'yes' is problematic at least, criminal at worst."

After having suffered significant negative publicity for his response to the past rape allegation, Parker chose to deflect the questions about his past legal problems while doing press for The Birth of a Nation at the Toronto International Film Festival. Shortly thereafter, Parker and his handlers chose to cut press interviews short when similar questions came up about his involvement with the alleged rape and its impact on the marketing of the film.

In an open letter, former members of the Penn State student body and staff who were present during Celestin and Parker's trial defended both men's innocence of the 1999 accusations. The group made allegations of police intimidation and a hostile racial climate on campus at the time; both Parker and Celestin are black while their accuser was a white female. The group wrote in The Root:

Nine celebrities came out in support of Parker, including Harry Belafonte, Chadwick Boseman, Hal Holbrook, Mel Gibson, Kevin Hart, Harvey Weinstein (who was later embroiled in a sexual assault scandal), Al Sharpton, Anthony Anderson, and Sheryl Underwood.

Holbrook wrote a letter to The New York Times defending Parker and the film. Holbrook praised The Birth of a Nation as "an exceptional piece of artistry and a vital portrait of our American experience in trying to live up to ideals we say we have" and suggested that owing to the film's critique of racism, Parker and his film were being held to a different standard than what Holbrook characterized as other "directors and actors who have rather public indiscretions, and who have in some cases been acquitted of them".

Prior to the film's release, it received several hundred one-star ratings on IMDb, possibly as a result of the controversy surrounding the allegations.  it holds an IMDb rating of 6.4/10.

Reception

Box office
In the United States and Canada, The Birth of a Nation was projected to gross around $10 million in its opening weekend. It opened to $7.1 million, finishing sixth at the box office. African-Americans made up 60% of the first weekend audience. In its second weekend the film dropped 61.2%, grossing just $2.7 million and finishing tenth at the box office.

Though making nearly twice its budget, the film was considered a financial disappointment. In assessing the mediocre opening weekend of The Birth of a Nation, The Washington Post reported, "While some moviegoers may have been put off by the controversy, middling reviews for the movie itself probably didn’t help. Meanwhile, historic dramas can be a hard sell: It's possible a lot of multiplex visitors just plain weren't interested." Adding to the film's problems, "Several prominent feminists decried Parker's defiant response to the [rape] scandal and pledged to boycott the film, which drew a protest vigil at Hollywood's ArcLight Cinemas."

Gabrielle Union, who appeared in the film, told Essence that she understood why some film-goers were avoiding the film and stated that she, as a rape survivor, could not sell it to anyone who chose to avoid the film due to the controversy. She said, "As a rape survivor and as an advocate, I cannot shy away from this responsibility because the conversation got difficult. I don’t want to put myself above anyone's pain or triggers. Every victim or survivor, I believe you. I support you. I support you if you don't want to see the film. I absolutely understand and respect that. I can't sell the film."

Critical response
On the review website Rotten Tomatoes, the film has an approval rating of 73% based on 268 reviews, with an average rating of 6.70/10. The site's critical consensus reads, "The Birth of a Nation overpowers its narrative flaws and uneven execution through sheer conviction, rising on Nate Parker's assured direction and the strength of its vital message." Metacritic gave the film a normalized score of 69 out of 100, based on 49 critics, indicating "generally favorable reviews". Audiences polled by CinemaScore gave the film an average grade of "A" on an A+ to F scale.

Justin Chang at Variety compared The Birth of a Nation to 12 Years a Slave, saying: "Parker's more conventionally told but still searingly impressive debut feature pushes the conversation further still: A biographical drama steeped equally in grace and horror, it builds to a brutal finale that will stir deep emotion and inevitable unease." He concluded, "The Birth of a Nation exists to provoke a serious debate about the necessity and limitations of empathy, the morality of retaliatory violence, and the ongoing black struggle for justice and equality in this country. It earns that debate and then some."

The Hollywood Reporters Todd McCarthy said, "The film vividly captures an assortment of slavery’s brutalities while also underlining the religious underpinnings of Turner's justifications for his assaults on slaveholders." He added, "The film offers up more than enough in terms of intelligence, insight, historical research and religious nuance as to not at all be considered a missed opportunity; far more of the essentials made it into the film than not, its makers' dedication and minute attention are constantly felt and the subject matter is still rare enough onscreen as to be welcome and needed, as it will be the next time and the time after that."

Michael Phillips of the Chicago Tribune was critical of Parker's direction, saying, "one of the drawbacks, ironically, is Parker's own performance. Even the rape victims of the screenplay have a hard time getting their fair share of the screen time; everything in the story, by design, keeps the focus and the anguished close-ups strictly on Parker. He's a good actor, but not much of a director; the visual style and approach of The Birth of a Nation tries a little of everything, and often too much of everything."

In its October 10 issue, The New Yorker ran two reviews, "The Cinematic Merits and Flaws of Nate Parker's The Birth of a Nation", by Richard Brody, and "The Birth of a Nation Isn't Worth Defending", by Vinson Cunningham.

Accolades

See also
 The Confessions of Nat Turner, a 1967 Pulitzer Prize-winning novel by William Styron
 A House Divided: Denmark Vesey's Rebellion, a 1982 television film about Denmark Vesey and his attempted slave rebellion
 List of films featuring slavery
 Nat Turner: A Troublesome Property, a 2003 documentary film by Charles Burnett
 Quilombo, a 1984 Brazilian drama film about Palmares, a fugitive community of escaped slaves
 Tula: The Revolt, a 2013 historical drama film about escaped slave Tula and the Curaçao Slave Revolt of 1795
 List of black films of the 2010s

References

External links

 
 
 
 
 
 
 Official screenplay

2016 films
2016 biographical drama films
2016 controversies in the United States
2016 directorial debut films
2010s American films
2010s English-language films
African-American biographical dramas
American biographical drama films
Cultural depictions of Nat Turner
Film controversies in the United States
Films about American slavery
Films about capital punishment
Films scored by Henry Jackman
Films set in 1809
Films set in 1831
Films set in Virginia
Films set on farms
Films shot in Georgia (U.S. state)